Aasa may refer to:

 Aasa, Estonia, a village in Estonia
 Aasá language, an extinct language of Tanzania
 Aasá people, an ethnic group of Tanzania

AASA may stand for:
 All Assamese Students' Association, New Delhi, India
 American Association of School Administrators, United States
 Australian Auto Sport Alliance
 Automobile Association of South Africa

People with the surname
 Aasa Helgesen (1877–1968), Norwegian midwife and politician

See also 
 Asa (disambiguation)
 Åsa (disambiguation), a Scandinavian given name